Keith Wallen (born February 24, 1980) is an American musician who is the rhythm guitarist and backing vocalist of the rock band Breaking Benjamin, former guitarist and backing vocalist of Adelitas Way, and the co-founder, lead singer and guitarist for Knoxville, Tennessee-based band Copper.

Wallen also co-wrote songs with other artists, including Saint Asonia ("Ghost" and "Beast" off Flawed Design), Love and Death (2021 album Perfectly Preserved), Red ("Sever" from Declaration), Pillar ("Call to Action" and "Lose It All" from Confessions), Icon for Hire ("Ready for Combat" and "Shadow", from The Reckoning), We Came as Romans ("Golden" from Darkbloom), Fuel ("Scars in the Making" from Angels & Devils), Dorothy ("Made to Die" from Gifts from the Holy Ghost"), Saving Abel ("She Got Over Me" from Saving Abel) and Emmaus Road ("Unbelief" from Transformed).

Biography

Early years and Copper
Copper's roots go back to Shady Spring, West Virginia, where Wallen and lead guitarist Shane Bragg had been friends since the first grade. They teamed up for occasional acoustic shows, but only began seriously putting a band together while Wallen was attending college at University of Tennessee in Knoxville and Bragg was enrolled at Middle Tennessee State University in Murfreesboro. The original lineup included Wallen, Bragg, bass player Brad Reynolds, and a rotating pair of drummers. They recorded Copper's debut album, Exchange (2001). Drummer and singer Brack Owens joined soon after Exchange was released, and a second album, The Fragile Fall, was recorded with producer Travis Wyrick and released in 2003. Bragg then left the band and was replaced by Shawn Lickliter. Owens and Lickiter were later replaced by Lincoln Nesto on drums and Mike Barnes on lead guitar.

The first single from The Fragile Fall, "By Now", went to Active and Modern Rock radio and entered the top 50 within nine weeks. "Turn" was the second single, was also registered on Radio & Records Active "Most Added" chart for two straight weeks, and reached the top 50 as well. In support of the album, a music video for a song "Inside and Out" was released.

In 2005, Copper was selected from 3000 participants as the winner of J. D'Addario, Guitar.com and Fuse "We're Listening" contest, resulting in appearance on the Fuse Daily Download in March 2006 and being the centerpiece of D'Addarios television and print campaign.

In 2008, Copper released their third album, Take My Chances. It included single "Broken Sky" and a song "Call to Action", which was covered and re-recorded by a Christian rock band Pillar for their album Confessions in 2009. Soon after the album release, Copper went on hiatus, playing two reunion shows: in 2011 and The Fragile Fall 15th anniversary show in 2018.

Copper has played more than 300 shows overall, headlining and supporting bands like Thirty Seconds to Mars, Shinedown, Seether, 10 Years, Breaking Benjamin, and Saliva.

Adelitas Way
From 2009 to 2013, Wallen was a guitarist and backing vocalist for Las Vegas, Nevada based rock band Adelitas Way. During the time with the band, he took part in recording of two albums, Adelitas Way (2009) and Home School Valedictorian (2011), as well as intensive touring and sharing the stage with such notable acts like Guns N' Roses, Creed, Papa Roach, Godsmack, Theory of a Deadman, Three Days Grace, Deftones, Puddle of Mudd, Sick Puppies, Staind, Alter Bridge, Skillet, Halestorm and others. Wallen also co-wrote three song for Home School Valedictorian, "Cage the Beast", "I Can Tell" and "Hurt".

Breaking Benjamin

On August 19, 2014, after four years of hiatus, Breaking Benjamin announced the reformation via the official Facebook page. The band re-emerged as a quintet, including Wallen as a guitarist and backing vocalist.

Solo career
On June 24, 2014, Wallen released his first solo effort, a five-track indie acoustic and piano driven Allies EP.

In 2018, Wallen released two alternative pop singles, "Summer Sunday" and "Four Letter Words", produced by Colin Brittain.

In 2019, three solo singles were released: two acoustic covers ("Shallow" by Lady Gaga and Bradley Cooper, and "The Look" by Roxette) and one original alternative rock song, "Crows".

Throughout 2020, Wallen posted pictures from the studio on his social media, hinting work on his debut solo full length album alongside Joe Rickard and Jasen Rauch. On January 15, 2021, "Dream Away", the first single off the album, was released, followed by singles "It Finds Us All", "All Eyes on You", "Wildfire" and "Fractured". On August 13, 2021, the album titled This World or the Next was released.

In 2022, Wallen recruited a live band consisting of Red's toring guitarist/backing vocalist Lucio Rubino, Breaking Benjamin's bass/guitar tech Mike Warren and drummer Blake Bailey of The Dead Rabbitts, played a couple of USA summer dates and joined Red for autumn European tour.

Discography
With Breaking Benjamin
 2015 – Dark Before Dawn 2018 – Ember 2020 – AuroraWith Adelitas Way
 2009 – Adelitas Way 2011 – Home School ValedictorianWith Copper
 2001 – Exchange 2003 – Fragile Fall 2008 – Take My ChancesAs a solo artist
 2014 – Allies EP
 2021 – This World or the Next''

Singles

Guest vocal 
 2021 - Love & Death - "The Hunter"
 2021 - Frank Zummo - "Ways to Go"
 2022 - Ra & Jason Hook - "Incomplete"
 2022 - We Are Pigs - "Clavicle"

Music videos

References

External links

 
 
 Keith Wallen at ReverbNation

Breaking Benjamin members
1980 births
Living people
People from Beckley, West Virginia